The Timor sparrow (Padda fuscata), also known as Timor dusky sparrow, is a small, approximately 14 cm long, plump dark brown songbird with a large silvery-blue bill, white cheek, pink feet and creamy-white belly. Both sexes are similar.

Its appearance resembles the closely related Java sparrow, but is smaller than the latter and has different coloured plumage. The Timor sparrow inhabits the grasslands and lowlands of the Timor archipelago. Its diet consists mainly of rice and seeds.

Due to ongoing habitat loss, limited range and illegal trapping for cage-bird trade, the Timor sparrow is evaluated as near threatened on the IUCN Red List of Threatened Species.  Some taxonomists place this species and the Java sparrow in their own genus, Padda.

References 
  Database entry includes a brief justification of why this species is near threatened.

External links 
  BirdLife International.org: Lonchura fuscata species factsheet

 Red Data Book.id: Lonchura fuscata

Timor sparrow
Birds of the Lesser Sunda Islands
Birds of Timor
Timor sparrow
Near threatened animals
Near threatened biota of Asia
Near threatened biota of Oceania
Timor sparrow
Timor sparrow
Taxobox binomials not recognized by IUCN